Tila Kenar (also Romanized as Tīlā Kenār; also known as Tīleh Kenār) is a village in Kelarabad Rural District, Kelarabad District, Abbasabad County, Mazandaran Province, Iran. At the 2006 census, its population was 374, in 109 families.

References 

Populated places in Abbasabad County